The Latin Grammy Award for Best Reggaeton Performance is an honor presented annually by the Latin Academy of Recording Arts & Sciences at the Latin Grammy Awards, a ceremony that recognizes excellence and promotes a wider awareness of cultural diversity and contributions of Latin recording artists in the United States and internationally.

According to the category description guide for the 2020 Latin Grammy Awards, the award is for "commercially released singles or tracks (vocal or instrumental) of recordings that contain 51% or more playing time of newly recorded (previously unreleased) material, and 51% playing time of Reggaeton music (as defined by the Urban Committee).  It may include a fusion mix of urban styles with other genres as long as “Reggaeton” predominates as the main music character. For solo artists, duos or groups".

The category was first awarded at the 21st Annual Latin Grammy Awards in 2020, with Bad Bunny behind the inaugural winner for his song "Yo Perreo Sola".

Recipients

2020s

References

External links 

Official website of the Latin Grammy Awards

Reggaeton Performance